This timeline of Islamic history relates the  Gregorian and Islamic calendars in the history of Islam. This timeline starts with the lifetime of Muhammad, which is believed by non- Muslims to be when Islam started, though not by Muslims.

Broad periods (Gregorian and Islamic dates)
Muhammad and the Rashidun Caliphs
 6th century CE (13 BH – 23 AH)

The Umayyad Caliphate, the Abbasid Caliphate and its fragmentation, the Mamluk Sultanate, the Delhi Sultanate
 7th century CE (23 AH – 81 AH)
 8th century CE (81 AH – 184 AH)
 9th century CE (184 AH – 288 AH)
 10th century CE (288 AH – 391 AH)
 11th century CE (391 AH – 494 AH)
 12th century CE (494 AH – 597 AH)
 13th century CE (597 AH – 700 AH)
 14th century CE (700 AH – 803 AH)

Regional empires and dynasties (Ottoman Empire, Safavid Empire, Mughal Empire)
 15th century CE (803 AH – 906 AH)
 16th century CE (906 AH – 1009 AH)
 17th century CE (1009 AH – 1112 AH)
 18th century CE (1112 AH – 1215 AH)
 19th century CE (1215 AH – 1318 AH)

Final period of colonialism and time of postcolonial nation-states
 20th century CE (1318 AH – 1421 AH)
 21st century CE (1421 AH – present)

Islamic centuries to Gregorian

 Islamic centuries to corresponding Gregorian years
 1st century AH (622 – 719 CE)
 2nd century AH (719 – 816)
 3rd century AH (816 – 913)
 4th century AH (913 – 1009)
 5th century AH (1009 – 1106)
 6th century AH (1106 – 1203)
 7th century AH (1203 – 1299)
 8th century AH (1299 – 1397)
 9th century AH (1397 – 1495)
 10th century AH (1495 – 1591)
 11th century AH (1591 – 1688)
 12th century AH (1688 – 1785)
 13th century AH (1785 – 1883)
 14th century AH (1883 – 1980)
 15th century AH (1980 – present)

See also 

 Timeline of science and engineering in the Muslim world
 History of Islam
 Timeline of Jerusalem

References

External links 
 Graphical Timeline of Islamic Rulers/Caliphate